This is a list of top class stations of China Railway.

 
Lists of railway stations in China